Myles is a Germanic and English surname meaning perhaps "peaceful".

Notable people with the surname

Alannah Myles (born 1958), Canadian singer-songwriter
Andrew Watson Myles (1884–1970), Canadian politician
Anthony Myles (disambiguation), multiple people
Billy Myles (1924–2005), American songwriter
Bruce Myles (born 1940), Australian actor
Charles Myles (1837–1903), Australian politician
Cree Myles, American influencer
David Myles (disambiguation), multiple people
Delvin Myles (born 1972), American football player
DeShone Myles (born 1974), American football player
Dion Myles (born 1976), Australian rules footballer
Edgar Myles (1894–1977), British soldier
Edward Albert Myles (1865–1951), English priest
Eileen Myles (born 1949), American poet
Emma Myles (born 1987), American actress
Eve Myles (born 1978), Welsh actress
Heather Myles (born 1962), American singer
Henry Myles (disambiguation), multiple people
Gareth Myles, British academic economist
Gilbert Myles (born 1945), New Zealand politician
Godfrey Myles (1968–2011), American football player
James Myles (1877–1956), British Army officer
Jesse Myles (1960–2010), American football player
John Myles (disambiguation), multiple people
Jonathan Myles (born 1982), American luger
Kristyna Myles (born 1984), British singer-songwriter
Lamar Myles (born 1986), American football player
Lynda Myles (disambiguation), multiple people
Margaret Myles (1892–1988), Scottish author
Marianne M. Myles (born 1953), American ambassador
Meg Myles (1934–2019), American model
Mercy Myles (born 1992), Ghanaian footballer
Nate Myles (born 1985), Australian rugby league footballer
Neil Myles (1925–1993), Scottish footballer
Noel Myles (born 1947), English artist
Patrick Myles (born 1979), English actor
Peter Myles (born 1968), Canadian editor
Reggie Myles (born 1979), American football player
Reggie Myles (athlete) (1924–1997), Irish sprinter
Simon Myles (born 1966), English cricketer
Sonia Jackson Myles, American corporate executive
Sophia Myles (born 1980), English actress
Thomas Myles (1857–1937), Irish surgeon
Toby Myles (born 1975), American football player
Trevor Myles, British fashion designer
Vic Myles (1914–1983), Canadian ice hockey player

See also
Myles (given name), a page for people with the given name "Myles"
Miles (surname)
Mile (disambiguation), a disambiguation page for "Mile"

References